The 2015–16 División de Honor Juvenil de Fútbol season is the 30th since its establishment. The regular season began on 6 September 2015 and ends on 17 April 2016.

Competition format
The champion of each group and the best runner-up will play in the Copa de Campeones and the Copa del Rey.
The other six runners-up and the two best third-placed teams qualify for the Copa del Rey.
In each group, at least four teams (thirteenth placed on down) will be relegated to Liga Nacional.
The champion of the Copa de Campeones will get a place for the 2016–17 UEFA Youth League.

League tables

Group I

Group II

Group III

Group IV

Group V

Group VI

Group VII

Copa de Campeones
The seven group champions and the best runner-up were qualified to this competition whose winner will play the 2016–17 UEFA Youth League. The draw was held at the headquarters of the Royal Spanish Football Federation on 19 April 2016.

Quarter-finals

Semifinals

Final

See also
2016 Copa del Rey Juvenil

References

External links
Royal Spanish Football Federation

División de Honor Juvenil de Fútbol seasons
Juvenil